Bolu is an electoral district of the Grand National Assembly of Turkey. It elects three members of parliament (deputies) to represent the province of the same name for a four-year term by the D'Hondt method, a party-list proportional representation system.

Members 
Population reviews of each electoral district are conducted before each general election, which can lead to certain districts being granted a smaller or greater number of parliamentary seats. With one of the smallest electorates of any province, Gümüşhane has consistently returned two MPs since the 1999 general election.

In 1999, Düzce in northern Bolu became a province in its own right, thereby receiving its own electoral district for the 2002 general election and electing its Members of Parliament in its own right. The number of MPs elected in Bolu therefore fell from five to three in 2002, while the newly created Düzce electoral district elects three MPs. Both Düzce and Bolu combined therefore gained one extra seat in 2002.

General elections

2011

June 2015

November 2015

2018

Presidential elections

2014

References 

Electoral districts of Turkey
Politics of Bolu Province